Ken Narasaki (born April 4, 1958) is an American playwright and actor. He is the former Literary Manager at East West Players theatre company in Los Angeles. He is the twin brother of civil rights leader Karen Narasaki.

Actor
Narasaki has appeared in a number of independent features including Jon Moritsugu's Terminal USA (1993), Chris Chan Lee's Yellow (1998), John Huckert's Hard (also in 1998) and Lane Nishikawa's Only the Brave (2006). Narasaki learned to speak German when he was cast as the lead in the German television series, Zwei Profis in 2002. He has appeared in over 65 plays in Seattle, San Francisco, Chicago, Los Angeles, and New York's Lincoln Center Theatre in the world premiere of Samuel D. Hunter's "Greater Clements", for which he was nominated for a Lucille Lortel award for featured actor in 2019.

Playwright
Narasaki's Ghosts and Baggage was produced at the Los Angeles Theatre Center in 1998.  Innocent When You Dream was produced in 2007 at the Electric Lodge in Venice, California and was performed at the Smithsonian Institution in 2008, as part of the "Day of Remembrance" of Executive Order 9066. The Mikado Project, co-written with Doris Baizley, was produced by Lodestone Theatre Ensemble at the Grove Center Theatre in Burbank, California in 2007. No-No Boy, adapted from the novel "No-No Boy" by John Okada, received its world premiere at the Miles Memorial Playhouse in Santa Monica, California in 2010. It went on to be produced by the Pan Asian Repertory Theatre at Theatre Row in 2014, and in Washington D.C. in 2016. No-No Boy,  directed by Anna Lyse Erikson was produced and recorded for broadcast for Los Angeles Theatre Works https://latw.org/  2020-2021 Digital Season https://latw.org/digital-season

Plays
 Ghosts and Baggage
 The Mikado Project - (co-written with Doris Baizley)
 Innocent When You Dream
 No-No Boy

Awards
 2007 Kumu Kahua Theatre Pacific Rim Playwrights Award - Innocent When You Dream
 2008 Pacific Rim Playwriting Award - The Mikado Project

References

External links
 
 No-No Boy play site

1958 births
Living people
American twins
American dramatists and playwrights of Japanese descent
American writers of Japanese descent
Male actors from Seattle
People from Los Angeles County, California
American male actors of Japanese descent
American film actors of Asian descent
American male film actors
American male dramatists and playwrights
20th-century American male actors
21st-century American male actors
20th-century American dramatists and playwrights
21st-century American dramatists and playwrights
20th-century American male writers
21st-century American male writers